In mathematics, the Artin–Rees lemma is a basic result about modules over a Noetherian ring, along with results such as the Hilbert basis theorem. It was proved in the 1950s in independent works by the mathematicians Emil Artin and David Rees; a special case was known to Oscar Zariski prior to their work.

One consequence of the lemma is the Krull intersection theorem. The result is also used to prove the exactness property of completion. The lemma also plays a key role in the study of ℓ-adic sheaves.

Statement 
Let I be an ideal in a Noetherian ring R; let M be a finitely generated R-module and let N a submodule of M. Then there exists an integer k ≥ 1 so that, for n ≥ k,

Proof 
The lemma immediately follows from the fact that R is Noetherian once necessary notions and notations are set up.

For any ring R and an ideal I in R, we set  (B for blow-up.) We say a decreasing sequence of submodules  is an I-filtration if ; moreover, it is stable if  for sufficiently large n.

Now, let M be a R-module with the I-filtration  by finitely generated R-modules. We make an observation
 is a finitely generated module over  if and only if the filtration is I-stable.
Indeed, if the filtration is I-stable, then  is generated by the first  terms  and those terms are finitely generated; thus,  is finitely generated.

That is, .

We can now prove the lemma, assuming R is Noetherian. Let . Then  are an I-stable filtration. But  is a Noetherian ring since R is. (The ring  is called the Rees algebra.) Then the induced filtration is I-stable again by the observation.

Krull's intersection theorem 
Besides the use in completion of a ring, a typical application of the lemma is the proof of the Krull's intersection theorem, which says:  for a proper ideal I in a commutative Noetherian ring that is either a local ring or an integral domain.

Thus, if A is local,  by Nakayama's lemma. If A is an integral domain, then one uses the determinant trick  (that is a variant of the Cayley–Hamilton theorem and yields Nakayama's lemma):

For both a local ring and an integral domain, the "Noetherian" cannot be dropped from the assumption: for the local ring case, see local ring#Commutative case. If  is a prime ideal of A, then we have:  for every integer . Indeed, if , then  for some complex number .

References

Further reading 
 gives a somehow more precise version of the Artin–Rees lemma.

External links
 

Commutative algebra
Lemmas in algebra
Module theory
Theorems in ring theory